Arena Metallurg is an indoor sporting arena located in Magnitogorsk, Russia. The capacity of the arena is 7,500 and was built in 2006. It is the home arena of the Metallurg Magnitogorsk ice hockey team. It replaced Romazan Ice Sports Palace in late 2006.

On the inside

External links 
Official website

Sports venues completed in 2007
Indoor arenas in Russia
Indoor ice hockey venues in Russia
Arena Metallurg
Arena Metallurg
Kontinental Hockey League venues
Arena